Timeless (or atemporal) or timelessness (or atemporality) may refer to:

 Agelessness, the condition of being unaffected by the passage of time
 Akal (Sikh term), timelessness in Sikhism
 Eternity, timeless existence or infinite duration
 Immortality, everlasting life not limited by time

Arts

Film and television
 Timeless (film), a 2016 German film
 Timeless (TV series), a 2016–2018 American science fiction series
 Timeless (Philippine TV series) or Sana'y Wala Nang Wakas, a 2003–2004 drama series
 Barbra Streisand: Timeless, a 2001 television special by Barbra Streisand
 "Timeless" (The Flash), a television episode
 "Timeless" (Star Trek: Voyager), a television episode

Literature
 Timeless (Carriger novel), a 2012 novel by Gail Carriger
 Timeless (Cole novel), a 2003 Doctor Who novel by Stephen Cole
 Timeless (Monir novel), a 2011 novel by Alexandra Monir

Music
 Timeless (Barbra Streisand), a 2000 concert tour
 Timeless (Bert Nievera), a 19902002 concert series
 Timeless (Mylène Farmer), a 2013 concert tour
 Timeless Festival, in Huddersfield, England 2002–2005
 Timeless Records, a Dutch jazz record label

Albums
 Timeless (Bobby Vinton album), 1989
 Timeless (Chuck Brown album), 1998
 Timeless (Dallas Smith album) or the title song (see below), 2020
 Timeless (Diane Schuur album), 1986
 Timeless (Eric Martin album), originally Mr. Vocalist 2, 2009
 Timeless (Goldie album) or the title song, 1995
 Timeless (Il Divo album), 2018
 Timeless (Isley Brothers album), 1978
 Timeless (Jim Ankan Deka album), 2012
 Timeless (John Abercrombie album) or the title song, 1975
 Timeless (Kenny Lattimore album), 2008
 Timeless (Khalil Fong album), 2009
 Timeless (Martina McBride album), 2005
 Timeless (Piolo Pascual album), 2007
 Timeless (Sarah Brightman album), 1997
 Timeless (Sérgio Mendes album) or the title song, 2006
 Timeless (Ungu album), 2012
 Timeless (Uverworld album), 2006
 Timeless (Wet Wet Wet album), 2007
 Timeless, Live at the Velvet Lounge, by Fred Anderson, 2006
 Timeless: Live in Concert, by Barbra Streisand, 2000
 Timeless: The All-Time Greatest Hits, by the Bee Gees, 2017
 Timeless: The Classics, by Michael Bolton, 1992
 Timeless: The Classics Vol. 2, by Michael Bolton, 1999
 Timeless, by After 7, 2016
 Timeless, by Cormac De Barra and Moya Brennan, 2019
 Timeless, by Home Free, 2017
 Timeless, by Jami Sieber, 2013
 Timeless, by Jeff Sipe, 2006
 Timeless, by the Quebe Sisters, 2007
 Timeless, by Shirley Brown, 1991
 Timeless: Songs of a Century, by Michelle Creber, 2012
 Timeless – Wendy Moten sings Richard Whiting, by Wendy Moten, 2014
 Timeless...The Musical Legacy, by Badfinger, 2013

EPs
 Timeless (Of Mice & Men EP) or the title song, 2021
 Timeless, by Ron Browz, 2009
 Timeless, by the Swon Brothers, 2016

Songs
 "Timeless" (Dallas Smith song), 2019
 "Timeless" (Queensberry song), 2012
 "Timeless" (Reece Mastin song), 2013
 "Timeless" (Zhang Liyin song), 2006
 "Timeless", by A Boogie wit da Hoodie, 2016
 "Timeless", by Badfinger from Ass, 1973
 "Timeless", by Benny the Butcher from Burden of Proof, 2020
 "Timeless", by DMA's from Hills End, 2016
 "Timeless", by In Flames from Subterranean, 1994
 "Timeless", by Make Them Suffer from Old Souls, 2015
 "Timeless", by NCT from NCT 2018 Empathy, 2018
 "Timeless", by Pestilence from Hadeon, 2018
 "Timeless", by Textures from Phenotype, 2016
 "Timeless", by UNVS, 2020
 "Timelessness", by Fear Factory from Obsolete, 1998

Other
 Timeless (radio network), a defunct American satellite music service
 Timeless Media Group, an American home entertainment company

Science
 Timeless (gene), a gene in Drosophila
 Timelessness, in canonical quantum gravity, a property of the Wheeler–DeWitt equation

Sports
 Timeless Test, a type of cricket match

See also
 Eternity (disambiguation)